Genetic relationship may refer to:

 Genetic distance, in genetics
 Genetic relationship (linguistics), in language

See also
Genetic relation